Kelly Heavner McFarlane (born October 2, 1992) is an American former soccer player who last played as a defensive midfielder for Houston Dash in the National Women's Soccer League.

Career

Club
McFarlane played college soccer for the University of North Carolina at Chapel Hill, where she appeared in 92 games, scoring five goals and tallying 14 assists. She played all the matches during the Tar Heels national championship season in 2012. McFarlane  was included twice in the All-ACC Academic Team.

During the 2014 National Women's Soccer League pre-season, McFarlane spent time with Houston Dash as a trialist. On May 14, 2014, she signed with the club. McFarlane spent the entire 2014 season with the club, playing 13 matches for them. Following the season completion, she was waived. After her professional soccer career, McFarlane pursued an academic and medical career being awarded a Knight-Hennessy Scholarship in 2019.

References

External links
 

1992 births
Living people
People from Mill Valley, California
Houston Dash players
Women's association football midfielders
North Carolina Tar Heels women's soccer players
National Women's Soccer League players
American women's soccer players
Soccer players from California